Acanthovalva is a genus of moths in the family Geometridae described by Martin Krüger in 2001.

Species
Some species of this genus are:

Acanthovalva bilineata (Warren, 1895)
Acanthovalva capensis Krüger, 2001
Acanthovalva focularia (Geyer, 1837)
Acanthovalva inconspicuaria (Hübner, 1819)
Acanthovalva itremo Krüger, 2001
Acanthovalva magna Krüger, 2001

References
Krüger, M. (2001). "A revision of the tribe Macariini (Lepidoptera: Geometridae: Ennominae) of Africa, Madagascar and Arabia". Bulletin of the Natural History Museum. 70(1): 1–502.

Macariini